Liberty Warehouse is a historic tobacco warehouse located at Mullins, Marion County, South Carolina. It was built about 1923, and is a 1 1/2-story, brick warehouse.  It features stepped parapets and has a metal double gable roof.  The warehouse is associated with the Daniel family, the most prominent family associated with tobacco in Mullins.

It was listed in the National Register of Historic Places in 1984.

References

Commercial buildings on the National Register of Historic Places in South Carolina
Buildings and structures in Marion County, South Carolina
Warehouses on the National Register of Historic Places
Commercial buildings completed in 1923
Industrial buildings and structures on the National Register of Historic Places in South Carolina
National Register of Historic Places in Marion County, South Carolina
Tobacco buildings in the United States